Ruyan Guo is an electrical engineer and the Robert E. Clarke Endowed Professor at the University of Texas, San Antonio. Guo was named a Fellow of the Institute of Electrical and Electronics Engineers (IEEE) in 2013 for her contributions to the understanding of polarization phenomena in ferroelectric solid-solution systems.

References

External links
 IEEE Fellow entry

Year of birth missing (living people)
Living people
University of Texas at San Antonio faculty
21st-century American engineers
Fellow Members of the IEEE
American electrical engineers